Žanil Tataj - Žak (born 2 May 1967), is a Croatian musician, singer, composer and producer.

Early life
Žak was born in Rijeka, Croatia. He graduated from Music high school in Rijeka, finishing the course of violin and viola. In addition to that he is also a multi-instrumentalist. Žak has learned vocal technics from his mother Petja Todorova - Tataj, famous piano player and vocal educationalist.

Career
Žak has started his rich music career in mid 80's in famous Rijeka's band Jersey. They've recorded their first album, Pustite Da Živim, for Yugoslav discography label Jugoton. They had numerous concerts all around Yugoslavia, and have received many different awards from various rock festivals. Between 1988 and 1991 he played a viola in opera orchestre of HNK Ivan Zajc.

In the beginning of the 1990s Jersey had stopped performing, because Žak was, known for his great vocal abilities, invited to perform with legendary rock band Divlje Jagode (Wild Strawberries). They've recorded album Magic Love, which was, because of intention of being published on the European market, sung in English. Because of the war in Yugoslavia, Divlje Jagode stopped performing and therefore Žak has started working with the Slovenian band Mary Rose. They've recorded album called Pleasure & Pain, but because of the fire blast in studio Tivoli, the album never saw the light of the day. Mary Rose then stopped performing for some years.  In the beginning of 1994, Žak has contributed on the joint project of the famous European rock bands Helloween and Gamma Ray. He also worked with Zoran Šerbedžija, ex-guitarist of  Crvena Jabuka on the project "Madcap Laf" in Germany.

In 1995 and 1996 he worked as an instrumentalist and vocalist on two albums of Slovenian band Turbo, called The Power Of Metal and A Glimpse Of Home.  In the second half of 1995 he founded a band in Croatia called Aqua, with whom he recorded a self-titled album.  He returned to Divlje Jagode with the concert Final top 1000 in Stuttgart. This concert was broadcast by SDR 3, MTV and other European TV and radio stations. With Divlje Jagode he recorded an album Sto Vjekova and successfully performed all over Europe until 1999.  In 1999 he recorded his first solo album and with few songs performed on  festivals like Neumski and Splitski.  At the end of 1999 he published his symphonic album, titled Božićne Pjesme(Christmas Songs).

In the beginning of 2000 he started performing with two Slovenian cover bands, Črna Gradnja and Ambasada.  Due to the urge for making original authors music, he and guitarist Eki Alilovski refounded Mary Rose in 2004. As the result of this work, they have released a new album titled Feniks, in 2006.  In 2006, he also founded a jazzy band Norne with famous Rijeka's vocalist, where Žak is playing a bass guitar. This band performs various songs in various languages and is getting ready for concerts and possible album.

In 2013 he joined Slovenian heavy metal band Black Diamond, after the release of their first album Last Man Standing, on which he sang most of the songs.  At the moment he is also working as a vocal coach in music school Studio Maraton.

In 2019 Žak founded a new band which performs under his name Žanil Tataj - Žak. In 2019 they've released singles Prosule se divlje jagode and [ Tišina]

2019 is also a year when Mary Rose, after years of health difficulties of some of their members, finally released new album Resničen Svet. Album was released on May 17, followed by a spectalural promotional concert in Postojna, Slovenia. This concert is hoped and expected to be an announcement of great come back of one of Slovenia's most legendary bands.

Discography

Albums 
 Jersey - Pustite Da Živim, (1986)
 Zele/Divlje Jagode - Magic Love (1993)
 Aqua - Aqua (1995)
 Turbo - The Power Of Metal (1995)
 Turbo - A Glimpse Of Home (1997)
 Divlje Jagode - Sto Vjekova (1997)
 Žanil Tataj Žak - Božićne Pjesme (1999)
 Žanil Tataj Žak - Divojčica Naranćica (2001)
 Mary Rose - Feniks (2006)
 Žika - Filozofija (2008)
 Black Diamond - Last Man Standing (2013)
 Jersey - Pustite Da Živim (re-release) (2018)
 Mary Rose - Resničen svet (2019)
 Žanil Tataj Žak - Da Capo (EP) (2019)
 Žanil Tataj Žak - Al Fine (2022)

Compilations 
 Dobro Jutro Opatija (1996)
 Ajmo Rijeka (1997)
 Najljepše Božićne Pjesme - Čežnja Vijekova (1998)
 Split '99 (1999)
 Divlje Jagode - Antologija 1 (2000)
 Divlje Jagode - Antologija 2 (2000)
 Etnofest Neum 2000 (2000)
 Korčula 2000 - Festival Pjesme I Vina (2000)
 Divlje Jagode - The Very Best Of - Let Na Drugi Svijet (2014)
 Najljepše Božićne Pjesme (2006)
 Divlje Jagode - Collection Boxset (2006)
 Divlje Jagode - Greatest Hits (2015)
 Divlje Jagode - Original Album Collection vol.1 (2018)
 Divlje Jagode - Original Album Collection vol.2 (2018)

Singles 
Boje Jutra (1995)
Gabrijel (1996)
Kao More (2000)
Divojčica Narančica (2001)
Ništa Nije Zauvijek (2001)
Prosule Se Divlje Jagode (2019)
Tišina (2019)
Na Putu Za Raj (2019)
Ispočetka (2019)
Da li ti je dosta? (2021)
Have you Had Enough? (2021) *As Jake Tate 
Na Jastuku (2022)
Buđenje (2022)
Novi Svijet (2022)
Hologram (2022)

Collaborations 
 Let 3 - Bombardiranje Srbije I Čačka (2005)
 Ženska Klapa Luka - Dani (2007)
 Divine Illusion - Genetic (2010)
 Divlje Jagode - Biodinamička ljubav (2013)
 Zoran Šerbedžija & Žanil Tataj - Žak - Ti Si R'N'R (2020)
 Divlje Jagode - Sama Si (album Jukebox) (2020)
 Srčani Udar (album Sve Ili Ništa) - Kad Te Pukne Pjesma (2020)
 Srčani Udar (album Sve Ili Ništa) - Priča Života Mog (2020)
 Ivan Pop feat. Žanil Tataj – Žak - Open your Eyes (2021)
 God’s Army (album Warriors Of The Wasteland) - Kindred Spirits (2021)
 Analiza Uma feat. Žanil Tataj - Žak & Zoran Mišić - Kraj (version 1) (2021)
 Analiza Uma feat. Žanil Tataj - Žak - Kraj (version 2) (2021)
 Srčani Udar feat. Žanil Tataj – Žak – Halo Svemir (2022)

Music and Executive producer 
 DNA - Naša Priča (2012)
 Sara - Ljetna (2013)
 Sara - Zauvijek (2015)
 Sara - Laku noć (2016)
 Silvija Starčević - Plan (2016)
 Silvija Starčević - Dobro Jutro (2016)
 Silvija Starčević - Hologram (2017)
 Carlo Božić - Tajna (2019)
 Lucija Gajzler - Reflection (2020)
 Tea Vučak - Sve Je Lako (2020)

Projects 
 Alen Šenkovski feat.Enio Vučeta – Za Sve Je Kriv Rock 'n' Roll (2022)

Projects: Albums In Preparations 
 Blindspot - Life Inflicts
 Ravenstine - Ravenstine
 Alen Šenkovski - Muzej Izgubljenih Duša
 Maciej Podsiadło - Christian Metal Machine

References

External links 
 http://www.maryrose.si/
 https://www.facebook.com/maryroseslo/
 https://www.facebook.com/ZanilTataj/
 http://blackdiamond.si/
 http://www.divljejagode.net/

1967 births
Living people